The 1980 United States presidential election in the District of Columbia took place on November 4, 1980. All 50 states and The District of Columbia were part of the 1980 United States presidential election. Washington, D.C. voters chose 3 electors to the Electoral College, who voted for president and vice president.

Washington, D.C. was won by incumbent President Jimmy Carter (D) by a 61-point landslide.

Carter's 74.9% of the vote represents the lowest vote won by a Democrat in the District of Columbia, while also being the sole presidential election when the Democratic candidate (albeit very narrowly) did not earn at least 75% of the district's vote.

Anderson's 9.3% is also the highest a third party ever got in D.C.

See also
 United States presidential elections in the District of Columbia

References

Washington, D.C.
1980
United States Pres